The Henry Clay and Bock & Company Ltd. Cigar Factory is a historic industrial building located at 507 Grand Street in the Chambersburg neighborhood of  Trenton, New Jersey.  It was built in 1932 to house the hand production of fine cigars and is considered the most architecturally distinct industrial building in the city, having been designed in the Spanish Revival style to highlight the Cuban origins of the company. It was added to the National Register of Historic Places on June 12, 1979 for its significance in architecture and industry.

History
The company moved cigar production from Cuba to Trenton in 1932 after a strike at the Cuban factory, and in order to avoid high tariffs.  Brands produced at the plant included Henry Clay, Bock, La Corona, and Village Brands, among others, with Winston Churchill counted a faithful customer.  At its peak in the 1930s the company produced a quarter of the fine cigar market in the United States, with 3000 employees at the Trenton plant.  The factory was closed in 1967 and production moved to Pennsylvania. The building was converted to apartments in the 1980s.

See also
National Register of Historic Places listings in Mercer County, New Jersey

References

Industrial buildings and structures on the National Register of Historic Places in New Jersey
Mission Revival architecture in New Jersey
Industrial buildings completed in 1932
Buildings and structures in Trenton, New Jersey
National Register of Historic Places in Trenton, New Jersey
Historic cigar factories
Tobacco buildings in the United States
New Jersey Register of Historic Places
1932 establishments in New Jersey